IASIS Healthcare, located in Franklin, Tennessee, was the for-profit owner and operator of medium-sized acute care hospitals in high-growth urban and suburban markets. IASIS owns or leases 17 acute care hospital facilities and one behavioral health hospital facility with a total of 3,581 licensed beds and has total annual net revenue of approximately $3.2 billion.  These hospital facilities are located in five regions: Salt Lake City, Utah; Phoenix, Arizona; five cities in Texas, including Houston and San Antonio; West Monroe, Louisiana; and Woodland Park, Colorado. IASIS also owns and operates Health Choice Arizona, a Medicaid and Medicare managed health plan in Phoenix that serves more than 197,000 members. IASIS Healthcare, its assets and employees have since merged with Steward Health Care System of Florida, the largest private operator of hospitals in the nation. The deal was estimated to be worth $2 billion.

Company Background
Founded in 1998, IASIS Healthcare is an owner and operator of community-focused hospitals in high-growth markets. IASIS Healthcare began principal operations in October 1999, in transactions arranged by the management team and Joseph Littlejohn & Levy. In 2004, Texas Pacific Group, a private equity firm managing over $13 billion in assets, led a group of investors to acquire IASIS. In February 2015, it filed for an initial public offering.

IASIS Healthcare Foundation
The IASIS Healthcare Foundation is a charitable organization that was created in an effort to provide healthcare services, supplies and training to disadvantaged regions around the world. The Foundation's first mission was a trip to the Serengeti Region in the east African nation of Tanzania. Since then, the foundation has provided aid to Haiti after the devastating earthquake as well as the Democratic Republic of the Congo.

Hospitals

See also
 Articles about hospitals currently or formerly owned by IASIS Healthcare:
 St. Joseph Medical Center (Houston, Texas)
 Jordan Valley Medical Center West Valley Campus (West Valley City, Utah)
 Salt Lake Regional Medical Center
 North Vista Hospital (North Las Vegas, Nevada)
 List of hospitals in Arizona
 List of hospitals in Colorado
 List of hospitals in Florida
 List of hospitals in Louisiana
 List of hospitals in Nevada
 List of hospitals in Texas
 List of hospitals in Utah

External links
 Official Site

References

Health care companies based in Tennessee
Companies based in Nashville, Tennessee
Privately held companies of the United States
Hospitals established in 1999
Private equity portfolio companies
1999 establishments in Tennessee